Cordulegaster obliqua, the arrowhead spiketail, is a species of spiketail in the dragonfly family Cordulegastridae. It is found in North America, often in clearings near small rivers and streams. The larvae can be found surviving in streams designated as intermittent, and may live up to 5 years before emerging as an adult in early summer. 

The IUCN conservation status of Cordulegaster obliqua is "LC", least concern, with no immediate threat to the species' survival. The population is stable. The IUCN status was reviewed in 2017.

Subspecies
These two subspecies belong to the species Cordulegaster obliqua:
 Cordulegaster obliqua fasciata Rambur, 1842
 Cordulegaster obliqua obliqua (Say, 1839)

References

Further reading

External links

 

Cordulegastridae
Articles created by Qbugbot
Insects described in 1839